Darren Davies (born 13 August 1978) is a former professional footballer, who is currently an assistant coach of the Young Socceroos and an assistant coach at Brisbane Roar.

Club career

A Wales U21 international, Davies started his career at Tottenham Hotspur in England, before becoming a member of the Barry Town squad to compete  in the UEFA Champions League qualifying stages. He later plied his trade in Scotland at Greenock Morton and Stirling Albion, before dropping into non-league football in England and Wales.

Managerial career

Davies has since relocated to Australia, initially employed as head coach at the Queensland Academy of Sport prior to taking a role at Melbourne Victory. In March 2013, he coached his team to success in the National Youth League Championship, and was also promoted to the assistant job of the senior squad, following Ange Postecoglou's promotion to the Socceroos.

On 24 July 2015, Davies was appointed as Paul Okon's assistant coach for the Young Socceroos, alongside his roles at Melbourne Victory.

On 30 May 2016, Gareth Naven was appointed as the coach of Melbourne Victory's NYL&NPL sides instead of him.

On 8 August 2016, Davies was appointed as an assistant coach at Melbourne Victory.

In June 2017, Davies, along with Kevin Muscat and Ross Aloisi, were called up by Ange Postecoglou to serve as members of Australia's coaching staff for the 2017 FIFA Confederations Cup.

On 28 December 2018, Davies was appointed as the caretaker coach of Brisbane Roar after the resignation of manager John Aloisi. Davies resumed his previous duty as assistant coach for Brisbane Roar following the appointment of Robbie Fowler as the club's new head coach.

In summer 2021, Davies joined Swansea City as their under 16s coach, and was quickly promoted to under 18s coach by November, when Byron Anthony left to become Bristol Rovers Academy Manager.

Managerial statistics

References

External links
Career details on www.11v11.com

Living people
1978 births
Sportspeople from Port Talbot
Welsh footballers
Association football defenders
Welsh football managers
Barry Town United F.C. players
Greenock Morton F.C. players
Stirling Albion F.C. players
Dover Athletic F.C. players
Tiverton Town F.C. players
Forest Green Rovers F.C. players
Merthyr Tydfil F.C. players
Wales under-21 international footballers